Odontosoria chinensis is a fern in the family Lindsaeaceae. Commonly called lace fern (Hawaiian: pala'ā, palae, or palapala'ā), it is native from India to Hawai'i, and south to Sumatra, Borneo and the Philippines, as well as other parts of the tropics and sub-tropics. It is commonly found in forest openings and disturbed areas such as landslides, along trails or roads. It grows in moist, shady areas from sea level to an elevation of 4,000 feet.

Subspecies
, two subspecies were recognized:
 Odontosoria chinensis ssp. chinensis
 Odontosoria chinensis ssp. tenuifolia (Lam.) Fraser-Jenk. & Kandel
Odontosoria biflora from the Philippines has also been treated as a subspecies of this species.

Uses
Hawaiians made red-brown dye from the old fronds. Pala'ā was used to treat "female ailments".  It is made into a lei using the hili, or hilo technique - a braiding or plaiting method with only one type of plant material. It is also made into haku with other plants using the wili or winding method and a backing.

See also
 Diplazium esculentum

References

External links
 
 Plants for Hawaiian Lei: Pala'ā (accessed September 25, 2015)

Lindsaeaceae
Plants described in 1753
Taxa named by Carl Linnaeus